The 2023 British Indoor Athletics Championships were the national indoor track and field competition for British athletes, held on 18 and 19 February 2023 at Arena Birmingham. The competition served as a qualification event for the 2023 European Athletics Indoor Championships.

Background
The 2023 British Indoor Athletics Championships were held on 18 and 19 February 2023 at Arena Birmingham. In the United Kingdom, they were shown on BBC television and online. The championships were used as a qualification event for the 2023 European Athletics Indoor Championships, though many athletes who had already qualified for that competition chose not to compete at the British championships.

Highlights

Ellie Baker won the 1,500 metres event in a championship record time of 4:06:73. The previous record had been held by Zola Budd since 1986. The 60 metres races were won by Reece Prescod and Daryll Neita respectively. Both athletes qualified for the European Indoor Championships as a result. Mary Elcock won the women's triple jump event on countback, after tying for the best distance in the event. Jazmin Sawyers won the long jump event, seven years after her last British title at the event. Aled Davies finished fifth in the able bodied shot put event, and broke his own world record for F42 classification athletes in the event.

The men's 60 metres para event was won by Kevin Santos, and the women's competition was won by Faye Olszowka.

Results

Men

Women

References

External links
 Results

British Indoor Championships
2023
Athletics Indoor
British Indoor Athletics Championships, 2023
British Indoor Athletics Championships
Sports competitions in Birmingham, West Midlands